Central section of the Western Beskids are a set of mountain ranges spanning the southern Polish and northern Slovak border. They constitute a section of the Western Beskids, within the Outer Western Carpathians.

In geographic classification, the term Beskid Mountains has several definitions, related to distinctive historical and linguistic traditions. Depending on a particular classification, designation Central in relation to the Beskids is also used with different meanings. In Slovak terminology, the term Central Beskids is used to designate this section of the Beskid Mountains within the Outer Western Carpathians. In Polish terminology, the same region is also classified as the central section of the Western Beskids, but not under the term Central Beskids, since that term is used to designate Lower Beskids of the Outer Eastern Carpathians.

Subdivision

The Central section of the Western Beskids consist of the following sets of mountain ranges:

 Orava Beskids (SK: Oravské Beskydy) + Żywiec Beskids (PL: Beskid Żywiecki) (the older SK equivalent of Beskid Zywiecki is "Slovenské Beskydy"- Slovak Beskids or "Kysucko-oravské Beskydy"- Kysuce-Orava Beskids)
 Kysuce Beskids (SK: Kysucké Beskydy) +Żywiec Beskids (PL: Beskid Żywiecki) (the older SK equivalent of Beskid Zywiecki is "Slovenské Beskydy" or "Kysucko-oravské Beskydy")
 Kysuce Highlands (SK: Kysucká vrchovina)
 Orava Magura (SK: Oravská Magura)
 Orava Highlands (SK: Oravská vrchovina)
 Sub-Beskidian Furrow (SK: Podbeskydská brázda)
 Sub-Beskidian Highlands (SK: Podbeskydská vrchovina)

See also

 Divisions of the Carpathians
 Outer Western Carpathians
 Western Beskids
 Eastern section of the Western Beskids

References

Sources

 
 
 
 

Mountain ranges of the Western Carpathians
Mountain ranges of Poland
Mountain ranges of Slovakia